The Ernest Loeb House is a historic house at 1425 Waverly Road in Highland Park, Illinois. The house was built in 1930 for Ernest Loeb. Architect Arthur Heun, who also designed a nearby home for Loeb's brother Allan, designed the house in the Georgian Revival style. The house's design includes a brick exterior, a fanlight above the front door, a pediment at the roofline above the entrance, and a hip roof. Landscape architect Jens Jensen designed the house's grounds, which feature characteristic elements of Jensen's work such as curved paths and native plants.

The house was added to the National Register of Historic Places on May 18, 1983.

References

National Register of Historic Places in Lake County, Illinois
Houses on the National Register of Historic Places in Illinois
Georgian architecture in Illinois
Houses completed in 1930
Highland Park, Illinois